= Tej Man Angdembe =

Nepali linguist

- तेजमान आङदाम्बे

Tej Man Angdembe is a Nepali language expert, writer and lecturer.

== Bibliography ==
- The Classical Limbu Language: Grammar and Dictionary of a Kirat Mundhum
- http://www.kurumbang.com/Why%20Federalism%20last%20one%20Tej%20Man.pdf
